The Kholzunskoye mine is a large iron mine located in southern Russia in the Altai Republic. Kholzunskoye represents one of the largest iron ore reserves in Russia and in the world having estimated reserves of 680 million tonnes of ore grading 30% iron metal.

See also 
 List of mines in Russia

References 

Iron mines in Russia